Opinions That DL Had (Portuguese: As opiniões que o DL teve) is a novel by Nobel Prize-winning author José Saramago. It was first published in 1974.

Novels by José Saramago
1974 novels
20th-century Portuguese novels
Portuguese-language novels